Richard Paget Murray (1842, Isle of Man – 1908, Shapwick, Dorset, Dorset) was an English clergyman, botanist and lepidopterist.

After secondary education at King William's College, he matriculated in 1864 at Corpus Christi College, Cambridge. There he graduated with a B.A. in 1868 and an M.A. in 1871. He was ordained a deacon in 1868 and a priest in 1869.

His herbarium contained plants from Ireland,  the Canary Islands,  Mauritius, Portugal, France, the Alps and the Dolomites. Specimens dispersed after his death are held by several institutions including the Natural History Museum (London) and Kew Gardens.

He was elected a Fellow of the Linnean Society in 1882.

Works
Arthur Cayley

partial list
Murray, Rev. R. P., 1873. Descriptions of new Species of Exotic Rhopalocera. Ent. mon. Mag. 10: 107–108.
Murray, Rev. R. P., 1873. Description of a new Japanese species of Lycaena, and change of name of L. cassioides Murray. Ent. mon. Mag.. 10: 126. 
Murray, Rev. R. P., 1874a. Descriptions of some new species belonging to the genus Lycaena. Trans. ent. Soc. Lond. 22(4): 523–529, 1 pl. 
Murray, Rev. R. P., 1874b. Some notes on Japanese butterflies with descriptions of new genera and species. Ent. mon. Mag. 11:166–172. 
paper in the Journal of Botany, British and Foreign.

References

Ray Desmond, 1994 Dictionary Of British And Irish Botanists And Horticulturists Including plant collectors, flower painters and garden designers London ; Bristol, PA : Taylor & Francis ; London : Natural History Museum, 1994. 

1842 births
1908 deaths
People educated at King William's College
Alumni of Corpus Christi College, Cambridge
English lepidopterists
Fellows of the Linnean Society of London